Jerry Schilling (born February 6, 1942, in Memphis, Tennessee) is an American talent manager, who was associated with Elvis Presley and as a member of Presley's Memphis Mafia from the latter part of the 1960s. His other clients have included the Beach Boys, Jerry Lee Lewis and Lisa Marie Presley.

External links 

Interview with Jerry Schilling
"Me and a Guy Named Elvis", Schilling's book

1942 births
People from Memphis, Tennessee
Living people
Elvis Presley